Lithophorus is a genus of dry bark beetles in the family Bothrideridae. There is one described species in Lithophorus, L. ornatus.

References

Further reading

 
 

Bothrideridae
Articles created by Qbugbot
Coccinelloidea genera